The 1952 Alberta general election was held on August 5, 1952, to elect members of the Legislative Assembly of Alberta.

Ernest C. Manning in his third election as leader of the Social Credit Party, and its first election since the Social Credit Party paid off Alberta's first debt in 1949, led it to its fifth consecutive election victory, increasing its share of the popular vote, and winning fifty two of the sixty one seats in the legislature.

The Liberal Party formed the official opposition with only four seats.  The Conservative Party returned to Alberta politics again, nominating candidates both under the "Conservative" banner, and under the "Progressive Conservative" banner recently adopted by its federal counterpart.  The party won two seats, one under each banner. The Cooperative Commonwealth Federation won two seats, one that of leader Elmer Roper. The remaining seat was won by an Independent.

This provincial election, like the previous six, saw district-level proportional representation (Single transferable voting) used to elect the MLAs of Edmonton and Calgary. City-wide districts were used to elect multiple MLAs in the cities. All the other MLAs were elected in single-member districts through Instant-runoff voting.

Voter turn-out was 59.4 percent in this election.

Results

Notes:

1 Taken from first count votes.

* Party did not nominate candidates in the previous election.

Members elected

For complete electoral history, see individual districts.

See also
List of Alberta political parties

References

Alberta
1952
1952 in Alberta
August 1952 events in Canada